The 2022–23 Mississippi State Bulldogs men's basketball team represented Mississippi State University during the 2022–23 NCAA Division I men's basketball season. The team was led by first-year head coach Chris Jans, and played their home games at Humphrey Coliseum in Starkville, Mississippi as a member of the Southeastern Conference.

Previous season
The Bulldogs finished the 2021–22 season 18–16, 8–10 in SEC play to finish 10th place. They defeated South Carolina in the second round of the SEC tournament before losing to Tennessee in the quarterfinals. They received an at-large bid to the National Invitation Tournament where they lost in the first round to Virginia.

Following the season, the school fired head coach Howland. On March 20, 2022, the school named New Mexico State head coach Chris Jans the team's new head coach.

Offseason

Departures

Incoming transfers

2022 recruiting class

2023 recruiting class

Roster

Schedule and results

|-
!colspan=12 style=""|Non-conference regular season

|-
!colspan=12 style=""|SEC regular season

|-
!colspan=12 style=""| SEC tournament

|-
!colspan=9 style=|NCAA tournament

Source

See also
2022–23 Mississippi State Bulldogs women's basketball team

References

Mississippi State Bulldogs men's basketball seasons
Mississippi State Bulldogs
Mississippi State Bulldogs men's basketball
Mississippi State Bulldogs men's basketball
Mississippi State